Oscar Pettiford (also released as Oscar Pettiford Modern Quintet) is an album by bassist/cellist and composer Oscar Pettiford which was recorded in 1954 and first issued on the Bethlehem label as a 10-inch LP.

Reception

The Allmusic site award the album 4 stars.

Track listing 
All compositions by Oscar Pettiford except where noted.
 "Sextette" (Gerry Mulligan) - 2:56
 "The Golden Touch" (Quincy Jones) - 2:33
 "Cable Car" - 2:20
 "Trictrotism" - 2:42
 "Edge of Love" (Harold Baker, Richard Ables, Mort Goode) - 2:24
 "Rides Again" - 2:33

Personnel 
Oscar Pettiford - bass, cello
Julius Watkins - French horn
Charlie Rouse - tenor saxophone
Duke Jordan - piano
Ron Jefferson- drums

References 

Oscar Pettiford albums
1954 albums
Bethlehem Records albums